Kwaku Gyasi (born 17 December 1977) is a Ghanaian gospel singer. His third album 'Ayeyi' was nominated for the 6th Ghana Music Awards. He won four awards during the 2007 edition of the Vodafone Ghana Music Awards.

Early life and education 
Kwaku was born to Angelina Appiah and Kwame Kyei, both traders from Elmina. He grew up at Asafo in Kumasi. He started School at APS and later attended the Kumasi Technical Institute (KTI) where he graduated in 1996.

Music career 
He discovered his talent of singing and playing of numerous musical instruments and decided to start his music career with the help of Elder Mireku, Elder Sarpong and the Church of Pentecost. His first two albums were 'Sumsum Kronkron Gya' and 'Onkwafoo'. He later added other albums like 'Ayeyi' and 'Onyame Aseda' to his songlist.

Personal life 
He is married to Mercy Adu Poku ..

Awards and nominations

Vodafone Ghana Music Awards 

|-
|rowspan="4"|2007
|rowspan="2"|'Onyame Aseda'
|Gospel song of the year
|
|-
|Gospel album of the year
|
|-
|Himself
|Gospel artist of the year
|
|-
|'Ade Akye Abia' featuring Christiana Love
|Best Collaboration of the Year
|

References 

Living people
21st-century Ghanaian male singers
21st-century Ghanaian singers
1977 births